Everlight may refer to:

 Everlight Electronics, a Taiwanese company which manufactures light-emitting diodes 
 Everlight (album), a 2012 album by Dreamscape